Vasile Morar (July 23, 1952 – June 15, 2005) was a Romanian ice hockey goaltender. He played for the Romania men's national ice hockey team at the 1976 Winter Olympics in Innsbruck.

References

1952 births
2005 deaths
Ice hockey players at the 1976 Winter Olympics
Olympic ice hockey players of Romania
Romanian ice hockey goaltenders